Anthophora bomboides is a species of anthophorine bee in the family Apidae. It is found in North America.

Subspecies
These two subspecies belong to the species Anthophora bomboides:
 Anthophora bomboides bomboides
 Anthophora bomboides neomexicana Cockerell

References

Further reading

External links

 

Apinae
Articles created by Qbugbot
Insects described in 1837